The Tudor Walters Report on housing was produced by the Tudor Walters Committee of the United Kingdom Parliament in November 1918. Its recommendation set the standards for council house design and location for the next 90 years.

The committee
Tudor Walters was the chairman, Raymond Unwin architect to Letchworth Garden City and Hamstead Garden Suburb was a member.

The background
In 1912 Raymond Unwin published a pamphlet Nothing gained by Overcrowding, outlining the principles of the Garden City.

The Local Government Board in 1912 had recommended that: 
Cottages for the working classes should be built with wider frontages and grouped around open spaces which would become recreation grounds, they should have three bedrooms, a large living room, a scullery fitted with a bath and a separate WC to each house with access under cover
The published five model plans. Two had an additional parlour, four were terraced and one was semi detached.

The First World War indirectly provided a new impetus, when the poor physical health and condition of many urban recruits to the army was noted with alarm. This led to a campaign known as "Homes fit for heroes". Also the Office for Works built the Well Hall Estate in Eltham for workers at the Royal Ordnance Factory, at Woolwich. This had been built on Garden City principles, with fine Arts and Crafts details.

The recommendations
The committee expected to 
Profoundly influence the general standard of housing in this country and to encourage the building of houses of such quality that they would remain above the acceptable minimum standards for at least sixty years
We regard it essential that each house should contain a minimum of three rooms on the ground floor (living-room, parlour, scullery) and three bedrooms above, two of these capable of containing two beds. A larder and a bathroom are essential.
This was to allow the penetration of sunlight even in winter.
There was to be secondary access to the sides of semi-detached houses and by ground floor passages through larger terraces. These terraces should be a maximum of eight houses long. The advantages of cul de sacs were noted as cheap method of providing services and preventing through traffic. The Committee noted the advantages of a varied provision of housing types and not restricting an estate to one social class.

Deep narrow-fronted byelaw terraced houses were to be avoided as the rear projection reduced air flow and light to the back of the house. (The middle-room problem). Wider frontages were preferred. The living room should be a light room and ideally a through room.

Three basic plans were suggested, based on cost and where the cooking would be done:
Living room with range where most of the cooking would be done, scullery with copper to heat the water, a bath and a gas cooker for occasional use.
A separate bathroom, cooking done in the scullery and the living room fire suitable only for occasional cooking
A separated upstairs bathroom, cooking done exclusively in the scullery. Meals would be eaten in the living room.
In addition it was suggested that superior houses would have a parlour, as this was a reasonable expectation for the artisan class.

A parlour house was to be  and a non parlour house to be . In the climate of 1918, 85% of the houses needed to be three-bedroom and 15% to be smaller or bigger. Pre-war the divide had been 40%/60%. A parlour of 
 was seen to be adequate – in effect . It was a quiet room for reading, writing, a sick relative or formal entertaining of non-family visitors.

It also suggested the use of district heating using waste heat from power-stations, the use of standardised components the positioning of community facilities and integration with public transport and phasing the construction of both.

Table

The legacy

In 1919 the Government required councils to provide housing, helping them to do so through the provision of subsidies, under The Addison Act (Housing Act 1919). The Housing Act 1890 had merely permitted them to do so. They were to be built to the Tudor Walters standards.

See also
 Parker Morris Committee

References
Notes

Bibliography
 
 
 
 

Public housing in the United Kingdom